Pt. Kanhaiya Lal Misra (31 August 1903 - 14 October 1975) was an Indian lawyer and independence activist. He was the Advocate General of Uttar Pradesh from 1952 to 1969.

Early life 
Misra was born in a Brahmin family of Mariyadpur (now in Mau) in district Azamgarh of Uttar Pradesh. As he was born on Krishna Janmashtami his parents named him Kanhaiya Lal. He was the eldest of four sons and one daughter of Baidnath Misra, a civil and a criminal lawyer, at the Azamgarh Bar, and a long-serving M.L.C.

Advocate General U.P. (India)

Misra was the fourth Advocate General of the state of Uttar Pradesh since the creation of the position of Advocate General in 1937, the year that saw the formation of the first responsible representative government in the province by the Indian National Congress, under the Government of India Act, 1935. He held this position for 17 years - 1952 till 1969 - during which period different political parties across the political spectrum were elected and formed the government. This remains a record as of date - October 2015.

He resigned as Advocate General U.P. in 1969 - the year his wife died.

Advocate Generals appointed till Pt. Kanhaiya Lal Misra:
 First Advocate General 	1937 
- Dr. Narain Prasad Asthana
 Second Advocate General 	1942 and First Advocate General of Pakistan	1947 
- Mr. Mohammad Wasim
 Third Advocate General 	1947
- Sir Peary Lal Banerji
 Fourth Advocate General	1952 till 1969
- Pt. Kanhaiya Lal Misra

Marriage and children 

Pt. Kanhaiya Lal Misra married twice.

His first marriage was to Savitri Devi who bore two children Shanti (daughter) and Vijay Prakash (son).

After the demise of Savitri Devi, he married Gayatri Devi who gave birth to the remaining children: Ravindra Prakash (son),  Justice Ajay Prakash (son), Jyoti (daughter), Priti (daughter), Ranjan (son) and  Munindra (son).

Smt Gayatri Devi died on 29 April 1969.

Timeline 

Pt. Kanhaiya Lal Misra studied at Banaras (Varanasi) in the Theosophical School under Dr. Mrs. Annie Beasant.

1925 - Graduated with honours in Economics securing 91% marks in English.

1926 - Sat for the Indian Civil Service Examination and securing 150/150 in the English paper, an unbreakable record. However, due to his student day's speeches of freedom and his influence by Mahatma Gandhi he was not selected.

1927 - Passed his Law Examination and joint the District Bar.

1930 - October, shifted to the Allahabad High Court. He had an exceptional command of the Hindi, English and Urdu language.

1942 - Imprisoned during the Indian freedom struggle in the Naini Central Jail along with Pt. Jawaharlal Nehru, Lal Bahadur Shastri, P. D. Tandon and others.

1951 - Offered Judgeship but on his request he was reluctantly not appointed. He attained eminence in the legal field with his flare of advocacy, depth of learning, sweet trapping court craft, humility, and a photogenic memory. His simplicity and brilliance was his landmark.

1952 - Appointed Advocate General, U.P. and continued till 9 March 1969 irrespective of the political party which came to power during this period.

1955 - Offered Supreme Court Judgeship (being the first advocate to receive such distinction) without being a judge. He requested through the Chief Justice of Allahabad High Court – Justice B. Malik, the then Chief Minister and Home Minister to spare him which again they did reluctantly. His reason was that he wanted to be in public life, serving institutions and the public at large.

1969 - Resigned as Advocate General U.P. - the year his wife expired.

As Advocate General U.P. he was closely associated with the Government and the Chief Ministers of Uttar Pradesh: 
 Pt. Govind Ballabh Pant,
 Dr. Sampurnanand, 
 Sri C.B. Gupta, 
 Smt. Sucheta Kripalani and 
 Sri Charan Singh.

He attained excellence in the legal profession in the country and appeared in most High Courts and Supreme Court of India. During the time he was Advocate General of U.P. and even thereafter he appeared for several states of the country in important cases, viz. Punjab, Madhya Pradesh, Maharashtra, Bihar, West Bengal etc.

Some famous cases conducted by him were the Blitz case in the Bombay High Court, Maharashtra – Mysore boundary dispute, case of Sri Pratap Singh Kairon, for States of West Bengal and Bihar, in-famous Symbol Case before the Election Commission, Gorakhnath Case in the Supreme Court and in the case against Murdhra etc. He had the distinction of appearing against almost all the top advocates of the country.

He appeared successfully for the state of Bihar against the Raja of Ramgarh in the Calcutta High court. He commanded the top position on both civil and criminal side and attained the position of a legal luminary and senior advocate.

Pt. K.L. Misra conducted on behalf of the ruling Congress, the Indian Congress Party Symbol Case in the Supreme Court, was also responsible for defending the State Government in the State Zamindari Abolition case and defended for some time Mrs Indira Gandhi, the Prime Minister, in her election petition case at the Allahabad High Court prior to his falling ill and thereafter the case was handed over to Mr. Sri Satish Chand Khare, Senior Advocate. Mrs Gandhi subsequently lost this case which led to the Emergency being imposed in India

Social works 

He also had the honour to serve the Allahabad University as its Hon' Treasurer and as a member of its executive council and also judged answer papers of the Law examination way above the L.L.B. degree that he held as his personal educational qualification in Law.

A relatively unknown trait of Punditji was his poetry writing capabilities (in Hindi) when emotionally charged - like on demise of his wife, Gayatri Devi.

Demise

Further reading 
 Sri Siddhartha Shankar Ray
 'Pt. Kanhaiya Lal Misra - My Father' by Munindra Misra 
 'Courting Destiny' by Shanti Bhushan 
 'Before Memory Fades: An Autobiography' by Fali S. Nariman

References

External links 

 Pt. K.L. Misra, Advocate General U.P.
 Poem by Pt. K.L. Misra
 Some Articles by Pt. Kanhaiya Lal Misra
 Many Splendoured Man by Sri Siddhartha Shankar Ray (Allahabad High Court Centenary)
 Pt. Kanhaiya Lal Misra 
 Pt. K.L. Misra
 Allahabad High Court Centenary Celebration (1866-1966) Vol. 1 & 2 and Post Centenary Silver Jubilee Celebration (1866-1991) Vol. 1 & 2
 Keynote Address on the 100th Birth Anniversary of Pt. K.L Misra - Lecture on Spirituality and Law

Advocates General for Indian states
Advocate General Uttar Pradesh
20th-century Indian lawyers
Indian National Congress politicians from Uttar Pradesh
Indian solicitors
Indian legal scholars
Indian Senior Counsel
Indian barristers
Quit India Movement
Senior Advocates in India
Allahabad High Court
University of Allahabad
Indian independence activists from Uttar Pradesh
1903 births
1969 deaths
People from Azamgarh
People from Mau
Politicians from Allahabad
Uttar Pradesh politicians
Scholars from Allahabad